National Telecommunication Monitoring Centre is a national-level intelligence agency of Bangladesh responsible for monitoring, collecting, and recording information and communication data. It is also responsible for the interception of electronic communication such as phone calls, emails, and social media accounts.

History
National Monitoring Centre was established in 2008 under Directorate General of Forces Intelligence. On 31 January 2013, National Monitoring Centre was reorganized as an independent agency named National Telecommunication Monitoring Centre and Brigadier General Ibne Fazal Sayekhuzzaman was appointed its founding Director. The centre moved from its office from headquarters of the Directorate General of Forces Intelligence in Dhaka Cantonment to its own purpose built headquarters on 1 January 2017. Its technology was updated on 6 April 2017. Brigadier General Ziaul Ahsan was made the Director of the centre on 6 March 2017. The government approved the purchase of 2.36 billion taka worth of equipment purchase for the centre to increase its monitoring ability. On 21 July, 2022 a new post has been created as Director General (DG) and existing Director Ziaul Ahsan promoted to Major General and he become the first DG of NTMC.

References

Government agencies established in 2008
Signals intelligence agencies
Bangladeshi intelligence agencies
2008 establishments in Bangladesh